In programming language type theory, row polymorphism is a kind of 
polymorphism that allows one to write programs that are polymorphic on row types such as 
record types and polymorphic variants. A row-polymorphic type system and proof of type inference was introduced by Mitchell Wand.

Records and record types 

A record  has the row-polymorphic record type whenever the field of the record  has the type  (for ) and does not have any of the fields  (for ).

The row-polymorphic record types allow us to write programs that operate only on a section of a record. For example,
 is a function that performs some two-dimensional transformation. Because of row polymorphism, the function may perform two-dimensional transformation on a three-dimensional (in fact, n-dimensional) point, leaving the z coordinate intact. There is no loss of information: the type ensures that all the fields represented by the variable  are present in the return type.

The row polymorphisms may be constrained. Thus, a classic record type is obtained.

Typing operations on records 

The record operations of selecting a field , adding a field , and removing a field  can be given row-polymorphic types.

Notes 

Polymorphism (computer science)